Renny is a masculine given name and a surname. It may refer to:


Given name
 Renny Arozarena (born 1971), Cuban actor
 Renny Bartlett, Canadian film and television director
 Renny Cushing (1962-2022), American politician
 Renny Harlin (born 1959), Finnish film director, producer and screenwriter born Lauri Mauritz Harjola
 Renny Quow (born 1987), Trinidadian male track and field sprinter
 Renny Ribera (born 1974), Bolivian retired footballer
 Renny Smith (born 1996), English-born Austrian footballer
 Renny Vega (born 1979), Venezuelan football goalkeeper
 Renny Wilson, Canadian pop singer-songwriter, record producer and recording engineer

Stage name
 Renny Ottolina, stage name of Venezuelan producer and entertainer Renaldo José Ottolina Pinto (1928–1978)

Surname
 George Renny (VC) (1825–1887), British Army major general and recipient of the Victoria Cross
 Henry Renny (1815–1900), British Army officer and 24th General Officer Commanding, Ceylon
 Walter Renny (died 1878), English painter and politician in colonial Australia

Fictional characters
 Colonel John "Renny" Renwick, a fictional aide of Doc Savage

See also
 Henry Renny-Tailyour (1849–1920), Scottish sportsman
 Rennie, another given name, nickname and surname

Masculine given names